Unemployment Insurance Tax System, or UITS, refers to an online application created by Iowa Workforce Development in 2007 to allow employer's to submit quarterly unemployment insurance tax reports online.

References

External links
UITS at Iowa Workforce Development
Unemployment Insurance Tax Information for Employers (Iowa Workforce Development)

Government of Iowa